Belomancy, also bolomancy, is the ancient art of divination by use of arrows. Belomancy  was anciently practised at least by Babylonians, Greeks, Arabs and Scythians.

The arrows were typically marked with occult symbols and had to have feathers for every method. In one method, different possible answers to a given question were written and tied to each arrow. For example, three arrows would be marked with the phrases, God orders it me, God forbids it me, and the third would be blank. The arrow that flew the furthest indicated the answer. Another method involves the same thing, but without shooting the arrows. They would simply be shuffled in the quiver, worn preferably on the back, and the first arrow to be drawn indicated the answer. If a blank arrow was drawn, they would redraw.

This was an ancient practice, and probably mentioned in the Book of Ezekiel 21:21, shown below in the original Hebrew, and translated to English in the New American Standard Bible,

"For the king of Babylon stands at the parting of the way, at the head of the two ways, to use divination; he shakes the arrows, he consults the teraphim, he looks at the liver."

Jerome agrees with this understanding of the verse, and observes that the practice was frequent among the Assyrians and Babylonians. Something like it is also mentioned in Hosea 4:12, although a staff or rod is used instead of arrows, which is rather rhabdomancy than belomancy. Grotius, as well as Jerome, confounds the two together, and shows that it prevailed much among the Magi, Chaldean, and Scythians, from which it passed to the Slavonians, and then to the Germans, whom Tacitus observes to make use of it.

Belomancy is also attested the pre-Islamic Arab religion. In his Book of Idols, early Muslim historian Ibn al-Kalbi mentions that there were seven divination arrows in front of the statue of Hubal in the Kaaba.

References

Divination
Book of Ezekiel
Archery